Viera is a female given name, similar to Vera. It means "faith" in the Slavic languages, though it is sometimes associated with the Latin word "verus", "true" (both words are derived from the PIE *weh₁ro- "true"). It was formerly a nickname for Vieroslava, and is pronounced vyeh-rah.

Name days 
The name is celebrated on various name days.
 Czech: 8 October
 Slovak: 5 October
 French: 18 September
 Latvian: 17 September
 Bulgarian: 17 September
 Russian: 30 September
 Swedish: 30 May

Notable persons with this name
 Viera Janárceková, Slovak pianist and composer
 Viera Schottertova, Slovak model
 Viera Scheibner, Slovak paleontologist and anti-vaccination activist
 Viera Tomanová, Slovak politician and Minister of Labor

External links 
 Viera on Behind The Name

Feminine given names
Slavic feminine given names
Czech feminine given names
Slovak feminine given names
French feminine given names
Latvian feminine given names
Bulgarian feminine given names